Nayef bin Fawwaz Al Shaalan Al Ruwaily (born 1956) is a Saudi Arabian high-ranking diplomat, politician, thinker, pilot, and businessman. He has played a key role in OPEC negotiations and a religious, political, and economic role in Saudi Arabia, Lebanon, Europe, the United States, and Venezuela. As a grandson of Prince Nuri Al-Shaalan, Nayef is a prince and a member of the House of Al-Shaalan.

Early life
Nayef received his early education in boarding schools in Switzerland and France and completed high school at the Lebanon Catholic School at the age of 14. Then he completed a double bachelor's degree in economics and civil engineering from the University of Miami, a double master's degree, and a Ph.D. in Civil Engineering from MIT, and another Ph.D. in International Strategic Advanced Studies from Princeton University. He speaks nine languages (seven living languages: French, Arabic, English, Portugees, Spanish, Hebrew, and Italian, and two dead languages: Latin and Ancient Greek). He lived in the United States from the mid-1970s to the mid-1980s.

Business career
Nayef owns significant oil interests in Colombia and Venezuela, and had a very special relationship with the former Venezuelan president Hugo Chávez.

Personal life
He is a grandson of Prince Amir Nuri al-Shaalan and a maternal grandson of the founding monarch of Saudi, King Abdulaziz. Nayef's older brother, Nawaf, is married to a daughter of King Abdullah. Nayef is the twin brother of Saud.

Nayef's father-in-law is Abdul Rahman bin Abdulaziz Al Saud, Saudi Arabia's former deputy minister of defense and aviation who was a member of the powerful Sudairi Seven. Nayef's twin brother Saud is also the son-in-law of Prince Abdul Rahman.

References

Nayef
Nayef
1956 births
Living people
Princeton University alumni
Massachusetts Institute of Technology alumni
Nayef
Nayef
Twin people